Red Bay may refer to:

Red Bay, Alabama
Red Bay, Newfoundland and Labrador
Red Bay, County Antrim, a townland in County Antrim, Northern Ireland
Persea borbonia, sometimes called Red Bay tree